The Greek mythological character of Antigone (Greek: Ἀντιγόνη), was a Phthian princess who was the daughter of Eurytion, was the wife of Peleus.  The meaning of the name is, as in the case of the masculine equivalent Antigonus, "worthy of one's parents" or "in place of one's parents".

Mythology 
Peleus was the son of Aeacus, king of the island of Aegina. Peleus and his brother Telamon killed their half-brother Phocus, possibly accidentally. To escape punishment they fled from Aegina. At Phthia, Peleus was purified by Eurytion, king of Phthia, and married Eurytion's daughter, Antigone. Peleus and Antigone had a daughter, Polydora who became the mother of Menesthius by the river god Spercheus.

During the hunt for the Calydonian Boar, Peleus accidentally killed Eurytion and fled Phthia. Arriving in Iolcus, Peleus was purified of the murder of Eurytion by Acastus, the king of Iolcus.

Acastus' wife, Astydameia, made advances to Peleus, which he rejected. Bitter, she sent a message to Antigone falsely accusing Peleus of infidelity, whereupon Antigone hanged herself (Apollodorus, iii. 13).

Notes

References 

 Apollodorus, The Library with an English Translation by Sir James George Frazer, F.B.A., F.R.S. in 2 Volumes, Cambridge, MA, Harvard University Press; London, William Heinemann Ltd. 1921. ISBN 0-674-99135-4. Online version at the Perseus Digital Library. Greek text available from the same website.
 Homer, The Iliad with an English Translation by A.T. Murray, Ph.D. in two volumes. Cambridge, MA., Harvard University Press; London, William Heinemann, Ltd. 1924. . Online version at the Perseus Digital Library.
 Homer, Homeri Opera in five volumes. Oxford, Oxford University Press. 1920. . Greek text available at the Perseus Digital Library.

Further reading 
 

Princesses in Greek mythology
Thessalian characters in Greek mythology